Vince Goldsmith, born July 20, 1959, was a star football player in the Canadian Football League (CFL), as both a linebacker and defensive lineman.

Goldsmith played college football with the University of Oregon Ducks (from 1977 to 1980) as a defensive tackle. At 230 lbs but only 5 feet 11 inches Goldsmith earned First Team All-Conference honors twice while becoming the school’s only defensive lineman ever to receive the Morris Trophy as top lineman. A 1980 Second Team Associated Press All-American, he recorded 13 tackles in his collegiate debut. His most productive year was as a sophomore, when he tallied 87 tackles (62 unassisted) and 14 tackles for losses. He finished his collegiate career with 281 tackles, including 34 sacks, or tackles behind the line of scrimmage. He was inducted into the University of Oregon Hall of Fame in 2002.

Thought too small for the National Football League, Goldsmith came to Canada and played for 10 years. He made an instant impression in 1981 with the Saskatchewan Roughriders, recording 17 sacks, being named an All-Star and winning the CFL's Most Outstanding Rookie Award. He was also an All-Canadian All-Star in 1983. He played with the Green Riders from 1981 to 1983 and again from 1988 to 1990; in his second stint with the Green Riders, he appeared in the team's Grey Cup win in 1989. He played 101 games with the team and came in second in team history for sacks with 89. He played 17 games for the Toronto Argonauts in 1984, and played 3 years (1985 to 1987) with the Calgary Stampeders.

His career total of 130.5 sacks is fifth best in CFL history.

References

1959 births
Living people
Players of American football from Kansas
American players of Canadian football
Calgary Stampeders players
Saskatchewan Roughriders players
Toronto Argonauts players
Oregon Ducks football players
Canadian football defensive linemen
Canadian football linebackers
Canadian Football League Rookie of the Year Award winners